Abell House is a historic home located at Leonardtown, St. Mary's County, Maryland, United States. It was constructed about 1910 and is a two-story, three bay frame dwelling.  The house commands sweeping views of Breton Bay, a sheltered harbor of the Potomac River. It exhibits a vernacular interpretation of the Queen Anne. It was built by Enoch B. Abell, a significant local political leader, attorney, and entrepreneur, who resided there until his death in December 1924.

Abell House was listed on the National Register of Historic Places in 2003.

References

External links
, including photo from 2003, at Maryland Historical Trust

Houses on the National Register of Historic Places in Maryland
Houses in St. Mary's County, Maryland
Queen Anne architecture in Maryland
Houses completed in 1910
National Register of Historic Places in St. Mary's County, Maryland